Franco Cerilli (born October 26, 1953) is an Italian former professional footballer who played as a midfielder. He made 90 appearances in Serie A, for Internazionale and Vicenza, and a further 253 in the lower divisions of Italian professional football.

His playing career ended with a five-year ban from football in the Totonero 1986 match-fixing scandal.

References

1953 births
Living people
People from Chioggia
Italian footballers
Association football midfielders
U.S. Massese 1919 players
Inter Milan players
L.R. Vicenza players
A.C. Monza players
Delfino Pescara 1936 players
Calcio Padova players
Serie A players
Serie B players
Sportspeople from the Metropolitan City of Venice
Footballers from Veneto